Echelon Conspiracy is a 2009 American action thriller film directed by Greg Marcks, from a screenplay by Michael Nitsberg and Kevin Alyn Elders. It stars Shane West, Edward Burns, Ving Rhames, Jonathan Pryce, Tamara Feldman, and Martin Sheen.

The film was theatrically released in the United States by After Dark Films on February 27, 2009, and was released on DVD and Blu-ray in the United States by Paramount Home Entertainment on July 21, 2009.

Plot
Max (Shane West), a young American computer engineer, acquires a mobile phone that receives strange text messages. First they encourage him to miss his flight which crashes soon after takeoff. Then the messages direct him to buy a certain stock, which increases by 313%. Next, the messages direct him to a hotel/casino in Prague to gamble. He first wins one-hundred thousand euro on a slot machine and bets the entire amount on a hand of blackjack, which he wins. Max then has an altercation with a beautiful woman (Tamara Feldman) and her jealous boyfriend in the hotel corridor, where he is knocked-out, and his mysterious phone is apparently scanned. Max wakes up with the smiling woman, Kamila, and asks her out for a drink.

To further his new-found career in gambling, Max enlists the aid of a Russian cabbie/apparent e-gadget enthusiast, Yuri (Sergey Gubanov), who outfits him with a text-to-voice earpiece to wirelessly receive his anonymous and lucrative text messages. He then hits the 3 million euro jackpot on a slot machine but runs away when casino security led by John Reed (Edward Burns) attempts to detain him. FBI Agent Dave Grant (Ving Rhames) interrupts the chase and handcuffs Max to interrogate him about the phone. Frightened, Max is unable to provide any information.

At this point, Agent Grant contacts Raymond Burke (Martin Sheen) of the NSA, apparently monitoring Max because of messages from an omniscient communication surveillance computer system known as Echelon. These messages have been responsible for the deaths of several Americans, most recently a Pentagon IT specialist. Burke recently lost a battle to pass a bill in Congress to allow Echelon to be upgraded by being uploaded into personal computers worldwide. Burke eventually decides that Max knows too much and must be eliminated; however, Reed and the beautiful woman from the hotel – now revealed as Reed's associate – come to Max's aid and spirit him away to Moscow. There, Max reconnects with the techie Yuri to get his help in discovering who is sending the messages. Yuri believes that the messages are coming directly from the computer itself, and that the system has somehow become self-aware and autonomous. Max and Reed don't agree but flee when more armed men arrive at Yuri's apartment. A car chase through Moscow ensues.

The chase ends with Reed outmaneuvering and blowing-up the pursuing cars led by Agent Grant, escaping injury; nevertheless, Max inflicts some payback for their previous encounter. Grant, who now receives threatening texts, asks Max to help to stop Echelon. Max receives another text, instructing him to return to Omaha, Nebraska, where he first worked as a computer security engineer. Max, Grant, and Reed all fly home on a military aircraft.

After arrival, the group finds a sealed-up bunker-like structure with a cache of servers and a high-end computer system that Max helped install years earlier and is revealed to belong to another victim of Echelon's messages - the same person whose credit card was used to send Max the phone. Max starts up the bunker's computer and is instructed via text to fire up the servers to connect them to the network for Echelon to download itself into the bunker's computers and to begin a countdown to replicate itself across the world wide network. Agent Grant calls Burke at the NSA to inform him; nonetheless, Burke wants the Echelon in the global network in the interests of US national security. Meanwhile, Max fails to stop Echelon's replication countdown, until he takes the idea of using the computer self-learning ability (also in 1968 Star Trek episode The Ultimate Computer and in 1983 WarGames). Max asks the computer about its primary purpose, and it replies that it aims to defend the US as defined by the Constitution. Max asks the computer to search for threats to the US Constitution. A lot of articles appear concerned about the recent attempts to secure Congressional approval to upgrade Echelon, underlined as a grave threat to personal freedoms. When the download is complete, Echelon shuts itself down, "learning" that it itself is the threat to both the US and the world due to the potential of misusage by those that control it.

In the end, Agent Grant and Reed send Max and Kamila to Paris while Burke is subpoenaed to appear before the Senate Intelligence Committee for his decision that endangering the US itself. In the final scene, back in Moscow, the techie Yuri is unveiled as a Captain in the Russian Security Service. He is commended for his actions and says they will soon start it again, but they have helped the Americans to make the right decision for the time being; "I want to believe so." he cryptically adds, turning off his mobile phone.

Cast

Reception
On review aggregator website Rotten Tomatoes, Echelon Conspiracy holds an approval rating of 8% based on 13 reviews. On Metacritic, it has a weighted average score of 26 out of 100, based on 5 critics, indicating "generally unfavorable reviews".

Joe Leydon of Variety wrote that the film "plays an awful lot like a direct-to-vid knockoff of last year's Eagle Eye" and "ups the ante with additional pilfering from WarGames".

See also
 List of films featuring surveillance

References

External links
 
 
 
 
 
 
 
 "Film Review: The Gift" by Duane Byrge at The Hollywood Reporter (May 16, 2008)

2009 films
2009 action thriller films
2009 independent films
2000s chase films
2000s mystery thriller films
American action thriller films
American chase films
American independent films
American mystery thriller films
2000s English-language films
Films about artificial intelligence
Films about assassinations
Films about computing
Films about security and surveillance
Films directed by Greg Marcks
Films set in Bangkok
Films set in Moscow
Films set in Prague
Films set in Washington, D.C.
Films shot in Bangkok
Films shot in Bulgaria
Films shot in Moscow
Films shot in Prague
Techno-thriller films
Dark Castle Entertainment films
Paramount Pictures direct-to-video films
2000s American films
Films set in bunkers